In finance and economics, a monetary authority is the entity that manages a country’s currency and money supply, often with the objective of controlling inflation, interest rates, real GDP or unemployment rate. With its monetary tools, a monetary authority is able to effectively influence the development of short-term interest rates, but can also influence other parameters which control the cost and availability of money.

Generally, a monetary authority is a central bank or currency board. Most central banks have a certain degree of independence from the government and its political targets and decisions. But depending on the political set-up, governments can have as much as a de facto control over monetary policy if they are allowed to influence or control their central bank. A currency board may restrict the supply of currency to the amount of another currency. In some cases there may be free banking where a broad range of entities (such as banks) can issue notes or coin.

Commonly, there is one monetary authority for one country with its currency. However, there are also other arrangements in place, such as in the case of the eurozone where the so-called Eurosystem, consisting of the European Central Bank and the 19 European Union member states that have adopted the euro as their sole official currency, is the sole monetary authority. Some countries do not have a central bank or other monetary authority, such as Panama.

Dissent 
Issues like central bank independence, effects or efficacy of central bank policies and rhetoric in central bank governors discourse or the premises of macroeconomic policies (monetary and fiscal policy) of the state are a focus of contention and criticism among policymakers, researchers and specialized business, economics and finance media.

Americas
Bank of Canada
Bermuda Monetary Authority
Cayman Islands Monetary Authority
Central Bank of Barbados
Eastern Caribbean Central Bank
Federal Reserve System (United States)

Asia
Central Bank of Sri Lanka
Hong Kong Monetary Authority
Maldives Monetary Authority
Monetary Authority of Brunei Darussalam 
Monetary Authority of Singapore
Royal Monetary Authority of Bhutan
Palestine Monetary Authority
Monetary Authority of Macao
Nepal Rastra Bank
Reserve Bank of India
 State Bank of Pakistan

Europe
Bank of England
European Central Bank
Hungarian National Bank
Bank of Latvia

Oceania
Reserve Bank of Australia
Reserve Bank of Fiji
Reserve Bank of New Zealand

See also

Central bank (List)
Deflation
Fiat money
Gold standard
Hyperinflation
Inflation
Mint
Monetarism
Seigniorage

References

Central banks